Treponema bryantii is a species of spirochete bacteria within the genus Treponema. This species is an obligate anaerobe and is found in the rumen of cows.

References

Further reading

External links
Type strain of Treponema bryantii at BacDive -  the Bacterial Diversity Metadatabase

bryantii
Bacteria described in 1980